

Archosauromorphs

Newly named phytosaurs
Data courtesy of George Olshevsky's dinosaur genera list.

Pterosaurs

New taxa

See also

References

1840s in paleontology
Paleontology